In traditional festive legend and popular culture, Santa Claus's reindeer are said to pull a sleigh through the night sky to help Santa Claus deliver gifts to children on Christmas Eve. 

The number of reindeer characters, and the names given to them (if any) vary in different versions, but those frequently cited in the United States are the eight listed in Clement Clarke Moore's 1823 poem A Visit from St. Nicholas, the work that is largely responsible for the reindeer becoming popularly known.  In the original poem, the names of the reindeer are given as Dasher, Dancer, Prancer, Vixen, Comet, Cupid, Dunder and Blixem.

The popularity of Robert L. May's 1939 storybook Rudolph the Red-Nosed Reindeer, and Gene Autry's 1949 Christmas song "Rudolph the Red-Nosed Reindeer", resulted in Rudolph often being included as the ninth character.

Many other variations in reindeer names and number have appeared in fiction, music, film and TV.

Origins and history

Single reindeer

The first reference to Santa's sleigh being pulled by a reindeer appears in "Old Santeclaus with Much Delight", an 1821 illustrated children's poem published in New York. The names of the author and the illustrator are not known. The poem, with eight colored lithographic illustrations, was published by William B. Gilley as a small paperback book entitled The Children's Friend: A New-Year's Present, to the Little Ones from Five to Twelve. The illustration to the first verse features a sleigh with a sign saying "REWARDS" being pulled by an unnamed single reindeer.

Eight reindeer
The 1823 poem by Clement C. Moore, A Visit from St. Nicholas (also known as Twas the Night Before Christmas), is largely credited for the modern Christmas lore that includes eight named reindeer.

The poem was first published in the Sentinel of Troy, New York, on 23 December 1823. All eight reindeer were named, the first six being Dasher, Dancer, Prancer, Vixen, Comet and Cupid, and the final two "Dunder" and "Blixem" (meaning thunder and lightning in colloquial New York Dutch). The relevant part of the poem reads:

Moore altered the names of the last two reindeer several times; in an early 1860s version of the poem, written as a gift to a friend, they are named "Donder" and "Blitzen"  (with revised punctuation and underlined reindeer names). The relevant part reads: 

When Edmund Clarence Stedman collected the poem in his An American Anthology, 1787–1900, he also used "Donder" and "Blitzen", italicising the names.

The modern German spelling of "Donner" came into use only in the early twentieth-century, well after Moore's death.

L. Frank Baum's ten reindeer
L. Frank Baum's story The Life and Adventures of Santa Claus (1902) includes a list of ten reindeer, none of which match those in A Visit from St. Nicholas. Santa's principal reindeer are Flossie and Glossie, and he gathers others named Racer and Pacer, Reckless and Speckless, Fearless and Peerless, and Ready and Steady.

Rudolph the Red-Nosed Reindeer

Rudolph's story was originally written in verse by Robert L. May for the Montgomery Ward chain of department stores in 1939, and it was published as a book to be given to children in the store at Christmas time.

Appearances in popular media
 Miracle on 34th Street (1947) features the eight reindeer from A Visit from St. Nicholas.
 "Run Rudolph Run" (1958), recorded by Chuck Berry, is a popular Christmas-rock song about Rudolph.
 Prancer, a 1989 film which tells of a young girl who finds an injured reindeer.
 Let's Go Dancing With Santa is a song by KC & The Sunshine Band featuring Santa and his reindeer.

See also

 Christmas Mountains
 "Dominick the Donkey"

Notes

References

Further reading
 

 
Christian folklore
Christmas characters
Fictional deer and moose
Fictional organizations
Literary characters introduced in 1823
Reindeer